Tabakov is a Slavic male surname, its feminine counterpart is Tabakova. Notable people with the surname include:

Anton Tabakov (born 1960), Russian actor
Boyan Tabakov (born 1990), Bulgarian football player
Dobrinka Tabakova (born 1980), British/Bulgarian composer
Emil Tabakov (born 1947), Bulgarian conductor, composer and double-bass player
Maya Tabakova (born 1978), Bulgarian rhythmic gymnast
Oleg Tabakov  (1935–2018), Russian actor 
Pavel Tabakov (disambiguation), multiple people
Pavlo Tabakov (born 1978), Ukrainian singer and composer 
Slavik Tabakov, British-Bulgarian medical physicist
Stanoy Tabakov, Bulgarian sambo and MMA competitor
Yuliya Tabakova (born 1980), Russian sprinter